Gene McCarthy (born 1938 in Rosscarbery, County Cork) is an Irish former sportsperson. He played Gaelic football with his local club St Finbarr's and was a member of the Cork senior inter-county team in the 1960.

References

1938 births
Living people
Cork inter-county Gaelic footballers
People from Rosscarbery
St Finbarr's Gaelic footballers